Patricia "Pat" Gage (3 March 1940 – 31 January 2010) was a Scottish actress.

Gage has had roles in televised productions since the mid 1960s. In 1977 she played the role of Dr. Roxanne Keloid in David Cronenberg's horror film Rabid. During the 1980s she mostly worked in American and Canadian TV productions. From 1998 to 1999 she played Lucy Becker in the TV series Highlander: The Raven. In later years she also worked as a voice actress. 

She was married to Paxton Whitehead from 1971 to 1986. She had one daughter.

She died from the cancer in the hospital.

Selected filmography 

1963: The Littlest Hobo (TV Series) as Mary Riley
1965: When Tomorrow Dies as Gwen James
1973: Keep It in the Family as Celia Sayers
1973: The Return of Charlie Chan (TV Movie) as Sylvia Grombach
1974: Why Rock the Boat? as Isobel Scannell
1974: Performance (TV Series)
1977: Rabid as Dr. Roxanne Keloid
1979: King of Kensington (TV Series) as Mrs. Enright
1987: As the World Turns (TV Series) as Corinne Lawrence
1987: Hello Again as Bejewelled Woman
1988: Diamonds (TV Series)
1988–1993: Street Legal (TV Series) as Judge Morton
1989: Looking for Miracles (TV Movie) as Grace Gibson
1990: The Little Kidnappers (TV Movie) as Mrs. MacKenzie
1990: Maniac Mansion (TV Series) as Elinor Edison
1990: Perfectly Normal as Mrs. Hathaway
1990: Counterstrike (TV Series) as Amanda
1991: Pure Luck as Secretary
1991: Road to Avonlea (TV Series) as Mrs. Hardy
1992: Child of Rage (TV Movie) as Laurel
1992: I'll Never Get to Heaven as Trea O'Doyle
1993: Secret Service (TV Series) as Jo Ann Hinckley
1993: Class of '96 (TV Series) as Eleanor Palmer
1993: Family Passions (TV Series) as Camilla Haller
1993: The Substitute (TV Movie) as Principal Beatty
1993: E.N.G. (TV Series) as Connie Antonelli
1994: Thicker Than Blood: The Larry McLinden Story (TV Movie) as Judge Lara Parkes
1994: Side Effects (TV Series) as Rina Himmel
1995: TekWar (TV Series) as Eleanor LaFeare
1995: The Silence of Adultery (TV Movie) as Olive
1995: First Degree as Margeaux Pyne
1996: A Brother's Promise: The Dan Jansen Story (TV Movie) as Gerry Jansen
1996: Hostile Advances (TV Movie) as Mrs. Ellison
1996: The Morrison Murders: Based on a True Story (TV Movie) as Aunt Clare
1996: Dangerous Offender: The Marlene Moore Story (TV Movie) as Maureen Woodcock
1996: Traders (TV series)
1997: While My Pretty One Sleeps (TV Movie) as Ethel Lambston
1997: Dinner at Fred's as Aunt Bonnie
1998: Earth: Final Conflict (TV Series) as Rachel Purcell
1998–1999: Highlander: The Raven (TV Series) as Lucy Becker
2000: American Psycho as Mrs. Wolfe
2000: Waking the Dead as Fielding's Mother
2000: Twice in a Lifetime (TV Series) as Mrs. Gerson
2000: The Miracle Worker (TV Series) as Aunt Ev
2000–2002: Anne of Green Gables: The Animated Series (TV Series) as Marilla Cuthbert (voice)
2001–2003: Doc (TV Series) as Irene Hart
2002–2003: Street Time (TV Series) as Mary Hunter
2002: Tracker (TV Series) as Judge Harriet Chapin
2002: Queer as Folk (TV Series) as Virginia Hammond
2003: Miss Spider's Sunny Patch Kids (TV Movie) as Betty Beetle (voice)
2003: Going For Broke (TV Movie) as Grandma Lois Bancroft
2003: Penguins Behind Bars (TV Movie) as Matron Hruffwater (voice)
2003: Finding John Christmas (TV Movie) as Eleanor McAllister
2004–2006: Miss Spider's Sunny Patch Friends (TV Series) as Betty Beetle (voice)
2005: Anne: Journey to Green Gables (Video) as Marilla Cuthbert (voice)
2006: Puppets Who Kill (TV Series) as Aunt Bambi
2006: Franklin and the Turtle Lake Treasure as Old Turtle (English version, voice) (final film role)

References

External links 
 
 
 

1940 births
2010 deaths
English film actresses
English stage actresses
English television actresses
English voice actresses